Colebrook Manor is a historic home located in West Whiteland Township, Chester County, Pennsylvania. The house was built about 1840.  It consists of a -story, double-pile stuccoed stone central block with a two-story stone service wing with frame addition.  It has a slate-covered gable roof with arched dormers.  It features a verandah with wrought iron columns.  Also on the property are a contributing barn and kennels.

It was listed on the National Register of Historic Places in 1984.

References

Houses on the National Register of Historic Places in Pennsylvania
Houses completed in 1840
Houses in Chester County, Pennsylvania
National Register of Historic Places in Chester County, Pennsylvania